Boettger's worm snake (Madatyphlops mucronatus) is a species of snake in the Typhlopidae family.

References

Madatyphlops
Reptiles described in 1880